

Notable burials: A–C 

 Yevgeniy Abalakov (1907–1948), mountaineer and sculptor
 Alexei Abrikosov (1875–1955), physician and pathologist
 Andrei Abrikosov (1906–1973), actor
 Grigori Abrikosov (1932–1993), actor
 Sergey Afanasyev (1918–2001), first Soviet space industry minister
 Ivan Agayants (1911–1968), KGB officer and foreign spy
 Sergei Aksakov (1791–1859), writer
 Vsevolod Aksyonov (1902–1960), actor
 Karo Alabyan (1897–1959), architect
 Alexander Alexandrov (1883–1946), founder of the Alexandrov Ensemble
 Boris Alexandrov (1905–1994), leader of the Alexandrov Ensemble
 Abraham Alikhanov, (1904–1970), physicist
 Nadezhda Alliluyeva (1901–1932), wife of Joseph Stalin
 Daniil Andreev (1906–1959), writer
 Averky Aristov (1903–1973), politician and diplomat
 Vladimir Arnold (1937–2010), mathematician
 Vasily Azhayev (1915–1968), writer
 Nikolai Basistiy (1898–1971), naval admiral
 Pavel Batov (1897–1985), army general
 Demyan Bedny (1883–1945), writer
 Andrei Bely (1880–1934), writer
 Pavel Belyayev (1925–1970), cosmonaut
 Georgi Beregovoi (1921–1995), cosmonaut
 Mark Bernes (1911–1969), actor and singer
 Aleksandr Blagonravov (1906–1962), military engineer
 Maria Blumenthal-Tamarina (1859–1938), actress
 Vladimir Bonch-Bruevich (1873–1955), writer
 Sergei Bondarchuk (1920–1994), actor and director
 Artyom Borovik (1960–2000), journalist and businessman
 Mikhail Botvinnik (1911–1995), chess champion
 Valeriy Brumel (1942–2003), athlete champion
 Valery Bryusov (1873–1924), writer
 Mikhail Bulgakov (1881–1940), playwright and author
 Nikolai Bulganin (1895–1975), Marshal of the Soviet Union and Premier of the Soviet Union
 Nikolai Burdenko (1876–1946), neurosurgeon
 Rolan Bykov (1929–1998), actor
 Feodor Chaliapin (1873–1938), opera singer
 Anton Chekhov (1860–1904), writer
 Vladimir Chelomei (1914–1984), rocket engineer
 Pavel Cherenkov (1904–1990), Nobel laureate in Physics
 Ivan Chernyakhovsky (1906–1945), General of the Army
 Georgi Chicherin (1872–1936), statesman
 Inna Churikova (1943-2023), Actress

Notable burials:  D–G

 Yakov Dashevsky (1902–1972), army general
 Kuzma Derevyanko (1904–1954), army general
 Alexander Deyneka (1899–1969), painter and sculptor
 Lev Dovator (1903–1941), army general
 Nikolai Dudorov (1906–1977), Soviet politician and civil servant
 Isaak Dunayevsky (1900–1955), composer and conductor
 Ilya Ehrenburg (1891–1967), writer
 G. El-Registan (1899–1945), poet
 Sergei Eisenstein (1898–1948), film director
 Ivan Fadeev (1906–1976), long-term finance minister
 Alexander Fadeyev (1901–1956), writer
 Klavdia Fomicheva, (1917–1958), WWII pilot and Hero of the Soviet Union
 Dmitri Furmanov (1891–1926), writer
 Ekaterina Furtseva (1910–1974), politician
 Shakir Geniatullin (1895–1946), army general
 Sergei Gerasimov (1906–1985), film director
 Reinhold Glière (1875–1956), composer
 Valentin Glushko (1908–1989), spacecraft and rockets designer
 Nikolai Gogol (1809–1852), writer
 Mikhail Gorbachev (1931–2022), Last Leader of the Soviet Union and former  President of the Soviet Union
 Raisa Gorbacheva (1932–1999), former "First Lady" of the Soviet Union and wife of Mikhail Gorbachev
 Andrei Gromyko (1909–1989), politician and head of state of the Soviet Union
 Lyudmila Gurchenko (1935–2011), popular actress, singer and entertainer

Notable burials: H–K 

 Nazim Hikmet (1901–1963), Turkish poet
 Dmitri Hvorostovsky (1962–2017), opera singer
 Ilya Ilf (1897–1937), writer
 Sergey Ilyushin (1894–1977), aeroplanes designer
 Archie Johnstone (1896-1963), journalist
 Dmitri Kabalevsky (1904–1987), composer
 Lazar Kaganovich (1893–1991), last of the Old Bolsheviks
 Nikolay Kamov (1902–1973), helicopters designer
 Leonid Kantorovich (1912–1986), Nobel Prize–winning economist
 Lev Kassil (1905–1970), writer
 Valentin Kataev (1897–1986), writer
 Anatoly Kharlampiyev (1906–1979), founder of sambo
 Velimir Khlebnikov  (1885–1922), poet
 Nikita Khrushchev (1894–1971), Leader of the Soviet Union (1953–1964)
 Sergei Khrushchev (1935–2020), engineer and academic, son of Nikita Khrushchev
 Igor Kio (1944–2006), illusionist
 Vladimir Kokkinaki (1904–1985), distinguished Soviet test pilot
 Andrey Kolmogorov (1903–1987), eminent mathematician
 Boris Korolev (1885–1963), avant-garde sculptor
 Olga Knipper (1868–1959), actress
 Rustam Khan Khoyski (1888–1948), Minister of Social Security of Azerbaijan Democratic Republic
 Leonid Kogan (1924–1982), violin virtuoso
 Alexandra Kollontai (1872–1952), politician
 Pavel Korin (1892–1967), painter and art restorer
 Zoya Kosmodemyanskaya (1923–1941), partisan and Heroine of the Soviet Union
 Pyotr Koshevoy (1904–1976), Marshal of the Soviet Union
 Gleb Kotelnikov (1872–1944),the knapsack parachute inventor
 Ivan Kozhedub (1920–1991), air force general
 Ivan Kozlovsky (1900–1993), opera singer
 Ernst Krenkel (1903–1971), explorer and radio operator
 Masha and Dasha Krivoshlyapova (1950–2003), ischiopagus tripus conjoined twins
 Peter Kropotkin (1842–1921), Russia's foremost anarchist
 Lev Kuleshov (1899–1970), film theorist and director
 Vladimir Krinsky (1890–1971), artist and architect

Notable burials: L–O 

 Lev Landau (1908–1968), Nobel laureate in Physics
 Alexander Lebed (1950–2002), army general and politician
 Sergei Lebedev (1902–1974), computer pioneer
 Vasily Lebedev-Kumach (1898–1949), poet and singer
 Pavel Lebedev-Polianskii (1881–1948), director of Glavlit
 Valery Legasov (1936–1988), Hero of the Russian Federation, chief of commission that investigated 1986 Chernobyl disaster
 Sergei Lemeshev (1902–1977), opera singer
 Yevgeny Leonov (1926–1994), actor
 Isaac Levitan (1860–1900), painter
 Yuri Levitan (1914–1983), radio announcer
 Maxim Litvinov (1876–1951), politician
 Matvey Manizer (1891–1966), Socialist realist sculptor
 Alexei Maresiev (1916–2001), flying ace
 Samuil Marshak (1887–1964), writer, translator and children's poet
 Vladimir Mayakovsky (1893–1930), poet
 Victor Merzhanov (1919–2012), pianist
 Anastas Mikoyan (1895–1978), politician and head of state of the Soviet Union
 Vyacheslav Molotov (1890–1986), politician and former Premier
 Kirill Moskalenko (1902–1985), former commander of Strategic Rocket Forces
 Vera Mukhina (1889–1953), sculptor
 Alexander Nadiradze (1914–1987), missile/weapon engineer and designer
 Vladimir Nemirovich-Danchenko (1858–1943), theater director
 Grigory Nikulin (1895–1965), Bolshevik revolutionary and chekist
 Yuri Nikulin (1921–1997), clown and actor
 Alexander Novikov (1900–1976), Air Force Marshal
 Sergey Obraztsov (1901–1992), puppeteer
 Vladimir Obruchev (1863–1956), geologist, geographer and explorer
 Nikolay Ogarev (1813–1877), writer
 Nikolay Ogarkov (1917–1994), Marshal and Chief of the Soviet General Staff (1977–1984)
 David Oistrakh (1908–1974), violin virtuoso
 Aleksandr Oparin (1894–1980), scientist
 Lyubov Orlova (1902–1975), actress
 Nikolai Ostrovsky (1904–1936), writer
 Arkady Ostrovsky (1914-1967), composer

Notable burials: P–R

 Ivan Panfilov (1892–1941), army general
 Anatoli Papanov (1922–1987), actor
 Valentin Parnakh (1891–1951), poet and jazz musician
 Vera Pashennaya (1887–1962), actress of theater and cinema
 Lyudmila Pavlichenko (1916–1974), female sniper
 Ivan Petrov (1896–1958), army general
 Ivan Petrovsky (1901–1973), mathematician
 Nikolai Podgorny (1903–1983), politician and head of state of the Soviet Union
 Aleksandr Ivanovich Pokryshkin (1913–1985), Air Force marshal
 Boris Polevoy (1908–1981), writer
 Nikolai Nikolaevich Polikarpov (1892–1944), aircraft constructor
 Vitaly Popkov (1922–2010), pilot
 Pyotr Pospelov (1898–1971), high-ranked Communist Party functionary
 Sergei Prokofiev (1891–1953), composer
 Aleksandr Ptushko (1900–1973), film director
 Vyacheslav Ragozin (1908–1962), chessplayer
 Arkady Raikin (1911–1987), stand up comedian
 Irina Rakobolskaya (1919–2016), chief of staff all-female 46th Guards Night Bomber Regiment in WWII; physicist
 Aleksandr Razumny (1891–1972), film director
 Sviatoslav Richter (1915–1997), pianist
 George de Roerich (1902–1960), tibetologist
 Mikhail Romm (1901–1971), film director
 Mstislav Rostropovich (1927–2007), cellist
 Elena Rozmirovich (1886–1953), politician
 Nikolai Rubinstein (1835–1881), pianist and composer
 Lidiya Ruslanova (1900–1973), folk singer

Notable burials: S

 Alexander Saburov (1908–1974), army general and politician
 Ivan Samylovsky (1905–1971), diplomat
 Otto Schmidt (1891–1956), scientist
 Alfred Schnittke (1934–1998), composer
 Alexander Scriabin (1872–1915), composer
 Ivan Sechenov (1829–1905), physiologist
 Nikolai Semashko (1874–1949), politician
 Yuri Senkevich (1937–2003), explorer
 Valentin Serov (1865–1911), writer and artist
 Boris Shcherbina (1919–1990), politician, oversaw recovery efforts after 1986 Chernobyl disaster and 1988 Spitak earthquake
 Alexey Shchusev (1873–1949), architect
 Vissarion Shebalin (1902–1963), composer
 Dmitri Shepilov (1905–1995), politician
 Dmitri Shostakovich (1906–1975), composer
 Vladimir Shukhov (1853–1939), civil engineer
 Vasily Shukshin (1929–1974), writer and actor
 Innokenty Smoktunovsky (1925–1994), actor
 Pyotr Sobennikov (1894–1960), general
 Leonid Sobinov (1872–1934), tenor and Director of the Bolshoi Theatre
 Sergei Sokolov (1911–2012), Marshal of the Soviet Union, Defense Minister
 Vladimir Solovyov (1853–1900), philosopher
 Konstantin Stanislavski (1863–1938), theater director
 Pavel Sukhoi (1895–1975), aerospace engineer
 Leopold Sulerzhitsky (1872–1916), theater practitioner
 Mikhail Arkadyevich Svetlov (1903–1964), poet
 Georgy Sviridov (1915–1998), composer

Notable burials: T–Z 

 Viktor Talalikhin (1918–1941), heroic army lieutenant
 Sergei Taneyev (1856–1915), composer
 Yelizaveta Tarakhovskaya (1891–1968), poet and playwright
 Yevgeny Tarle (1874–1955), historian
 Vladimir Tatlin (1885–1953), painter and architect
 Vasily Tikhomirov (1876–1956), choreographer
 Nikolai Tikhonov (1905–1997), politician
 Gherman Titov (1935–2000), cosmonaut, second man in space
 Aleksey Tolstoy (1882–1945), writer
 Pavel Tretyakov (1832–1898), businessman and art collector
 Andrei Tupolev (1888–1972), aircraft designer
 Aleksandr Tvardovsky (1910–1971), writer
 Galina Ulanova (1909–1998), prima ballerina
 Vasili Ulrikh (1889–1951), military judge
 Mikhail Ulyanov (1927–2007), actor
 Yevgeny Vakhtangov (1883–1922), theater director
 Arkady Volsky (1932–2006), politician and businessman
 Sergey Vavilov (1891–1951), physicist
 Vladimir Vernadsky (1863–1945), mineralogist and a geochemist
 Alexander Vertinsky (1889–1957), singer
 Dziga Vertov (1896–1954), filmmaker
 Ivan Vinogradov (1891–1983), mathematician
 Galina Vishnevskaya (1926–2012), operatic soprano & wife of Mstislav Rostropovich
 Lev Semyonovich Vygotsky (1896–1934), psychologist
 Boris Yefimov (1899/1900–2008), political cartoonist
 Boris Yeltsin (1931–2007), the first President of the Russian Federation
 Yevgeniy Yevstigneyev (1926–1992), actor
 Yakov Yurovsky (1878–1938), chief executioner of Tsar Nicholas II and his family
 Nikolay Zabolotsky (1903–1958), poet
 Nikolay Zelinskiy (1861–1953), chemist
 Vladimir Zhirinovsky (1946-2022), politician and lawyer
 Georgiy Zhzhonov (1915–2005), actor